Micheál Webster (born 1 August 1977) is an Irish hurler and Gaelic footballer who played as a full-forward for the Tipperary senior team.

Webster made his first appearance for the Tipperary senior football team during the 2003 National League and was a regular dual player until his retirement after the 2009 hurling championship. During that time he won two Munster hurling medals. He has ended up as an All-Ireland runner-up on one occasion.

At club level Webster is a dual county senior championship medalist with Loughmore–Castleiney.

Playing career

Club

Webster plays his club hurling and football with Loughmore–Castleiney GAA.

In 2004 he was a member of the Loughmore senior football team that reached the county championship decider. Moyle Rovers were the opponents, however, a 0-9 to 0-6 victory gave Webster a county football championship medal.

Three years later 2007 Webster was on the Loughmore–Castleiney team that reached the county hurling championship final. Drom & Inch provided the opposition, however, the game was one-sided in nature. A 0-22 to 0-13 victory gave Webster a county hurling championship medal.  Loughmore–Castleiney later reached the provincial final against Tulla. In bad weather Loughmore–Castleiney emerged as winners by 1-6 to 0-7 giving Webster a Munster medal.

Inter-county

Webster first came to prominence on the inter-count scene as a member of the Tipperary junior football team during the 2002 campaign.

The following year Webster joined the Tipp senior football team. He made his debut as a substitute in a National League game against Waterford and was used on a regular basis during the rest of the campaign.

In 2004 he made his championship debut with the Tipperary senior football team when he came on as a substitute in a defeat by Limerick.

By 2005 Webster had joined the Tipperary senior hurling team. He made his debut in a National League game against Down that year, and immediately became a regular member of the team.

After losing back-to-back Munster finals to Cork in 2005 and 2006 and a disastrous season in 2007, things began to change for Tipp in 2009. Tipperary qualified for the Munster final that year where they defeated Clare by 2-21 to 0-19.  Webster collected his first Munster medal that day, however, Tipperary were subsequently defeated in an All-Ireland semi-final by Waterford on a scoreline of 1-20 to 1-18. Cummins was once again presented with an All-Star award.

In 2009 Webster won his second Munster medal as Tipp defeated Waterford by 4-14 to 2-16. After a six-week lay-off and a semi-final win over Limerick,  Tipperary qualified for an All-Ireland final meeting with Kilkenny.  Two quick goals in the space of a minute, one from a penalty by Henry Shefflin, meant a 2-22 to 0-23 defeat for Tipperary.

References

1985 births
Living people
Loughmore-Castleiney hurlers
Loughmore-Castleiney Gaelic footballers
Tipperary inter-county hurlers
Tipperary inter-county Gaelic footballers